Lin Yun-Ju ( born 17 August 2001) is a Taiwanese table tennis player. He is a left-handed player who plays with the shakehand grip.

Personal life
Lin was born in Yuanshan, Yilan County, Taiwan. He graduated from Taipei Municipal Nei-Hu Vocational High School and is currently studying at Fu Jen Catholic University.

Career

2019
Lin started competing in the International Table Tennis Federation (ITTF) senior circuit in 2016. He won two major tournaments in a row in 2019, first the T2 Diamond Malaysia in July, followed in August by his first ITTF World Tour title, the Czech Open at the age of only 18. In these tournaments, he had beaten some of the top players,  including Ma Long, Fan Zhendong, Dimitrij Ovtcharov and Timo Boll.

2021
Lin trained in China along with members of the Chinese national team and other selected foreigners from late 2020 until early 2021. His first international event was WTT Contender at World Table Tennis' inaugural event WTT Doha, where he reached the finals after defeating Quadri Aruna in the quarter-finals and Simon Gauzy in the semi-finals before being upset by Dimitrij Ovtcharov in the finals. In the WTT Star Contender event, Lin suffered a quarter-final upset against Ruwen Filus. However, Lin walked out of Doha with control of the fourth seed for the men's singles event at the 2020 Tokyo Olympics. In April, ITTF amended the Olympic seeding system so that Lin fell back to the fifth seed below Hugo Calderano.

Lin placed fourth at the 2020 Tokyo Olympics after losing to Dimitrij Ovtcharov in the bronze-medal match. Lin defeated Ovtcharov in the team event later, but Taiwan ultimately fell to Germany 3–2 in the quarter-finals.

Achievements

Major tournaments

Singles titles

References

External links

2001 births
Living people
Asian Games medalists in table tennis
Asian Games bronze medalists for Chinese Taipei
Fu Jen Catholic University alumni
Medalists at the 2018 Asian Games
Medalists at the 2020 Summer Olympics
Olympic bronze medalists for Taiwan
Table tennis players at the 2018 Summer Youth Olympics
Table tennis players at the 2018 Asian Games
Table tennis players at the 2020 Summer Olympics
Taiwanese male table tennis players
Olympic medalists in table tennis
World Table Tennis Championships medalists
Olympic table tennis players of Taiwan
21st-century Taiwanese people